Warner Space Walker or Spacewalker may refer to:

Warner Space Walker I, a single-seat American homebuilt aircraft
Warner Space Walker II, a two-seat American homebuilt aircraft